Richard Ryan (27 February 1929 – 17 March 2019) was an Irish Fine Gael politician who served as Minister for Finance and Minister for the Public Service from 1973 to 1977 and a Member of the European Court of Auditors from 1986 to 1989. He served as a Member of the European Parliament (MEP) from 1977 to 1986. He served as a Teachta Dála (TD) from 1959 to 1982.

Background
Ryan was born in Dublin in 1929. He was educated at Synge Street CBS, University College Dublin (UCD), where he studied economics and jurisprudence, and the Incorporated Law School of Ireland, subsequently qualifying as a solicitor. A formidable orator, at UCD he was auditor of the Literary and Historical Society (the L&H) and subsequently of the Solicitors Apprentice Debating Society (1950), and won both societies' gold medals for debating. He served as an Honorary Vice-President of the L&H.

After qualifying, Ryan worked for a number of solicitors' firms before establishing a private practice in Dame Street in Dublin, in which he remained an active partner until appointed to ministerial office in 1973.

Politics
He first held political office when he was elected to Dáil Éireann as a Fine Gael TD for Dublin South-West in a 1959 by-election, and retained his seat until he retired at the February 1982 general election to concentrate on his European Parliament seat.

In opposition, Ryan served as Fine Gael Spokesperson on Health and Social Welfare (1966–1970) and on Foreign Affairs and Northern Ireland (1970–1973). During this period he was involved in a number of important pro bono legal cases, including the 1963 challenge in the High Court, and then, on appeal, in the Supreme Court of Ireland in 1964, by Gladys Ryan (no relation) on the constitutionality of the fluoridation of the water supply. While the court ruled against Gladys Ryan, the case remains a landmark, for it established the right to privacy under the Constitution of Ireland (or, perhaps more precisely, the right to bodily integrity under Article 40.3.1.). The case also raised a legal controversy, owing to the introduction by Justice Kenny of the concept of unenumerated rights. Other notable cases involving Richie Ryan include a challenge to the rules governing the drafting of constituency boundaries, and an unsuccessful attempt to randomise the order of candidates on ballot papers (owing to a preponderance of TDs with surnames from the first part of the alphabet).

Fine Gael came to power in a coalition with the Labour Party in 1973, and Ryan became Minister for Finance. He presided over a tough four years in the National Coalition under Liam Cosgrave, during the 1970s oil crisis when, in common with most western economies, Ireland faced a significant recession. He was variously lampooned as "Richie Ruin" on the Irish satire show Hall's Pictorial Weekly, and as "Red Richie" for his government's introduction of a wealth tax. Following the 1977 general election Fine Gael was out of power, and Ryan once again became Spokesperson on Foreign Affairs.

Ryan also served as a Member of the European Parliament (MEP) in 1973 and from 1977 to 1979, being appointed to Ireland's first delegation and third delegation. At the first direct elections to the European Parliament in 1979, he was elected for the Dublin constituency, and was re-elected in 1984, heading the poll on both occasions.

On being appointed to the European Court of Auditors in 1986, he resigned his seat and was succeeded by Chris O'Malley. He served as a member of the Court of Auditors from 1986 to 1994, being replaced by Barry Desmond. After retirement he continued in a number of roles, including as a Commissioner of Irish Lights (until 2004) and a spell as Chairman of the Irish Red Cross in 1998.

He was the father of the economist and academic Cillian Ryan. He died on 17 March 2019, aged 90.

References

External links

 

1929 births
2019 deaths
Alumni of University College Dublin
Fine Gael MEPs
Fine Gael TDs
Irish solicitors
Members of the 16th Dáil
Members of the 17th Dáil
Members of the 18th Dáil
Members of the 19th Dáil
Members of the 20th Dáil
Members of the 21st Dáil
Members of the 22nd Dáil
MEPs for the Republic of Ireland 1984–1989
MEPs for the Republic of Ireland 1979–1984
MEPs for the Republic of Ireland 1977–1979
MEPs for the Republic of Ireland 1973
Ministers for Finance (Ireland)
Politicians from County Dublin
People educated at Synge Street CBS